Mobarakabad-e Kalleh Rash (also Romanized as Mobārakābād-e Kalleh Rash, Mobārākābād-e Koleh Rash, Mobārakābād Kalleh Rash, and  Mobārakābād-e Kalehrash; also known as Daklehrash, Kalleh-ye Rash, Kularash, Mobārakābād, Qal‘eh-ye Rash, and Qulleh Rash) is a village in Sis Rural District, Bolbanabad District, Dehgolan County, Kurdistan Province, Iran. At the 2006 census, its population was 669, in 160 families. The village is populated by Kurds.

References 

Towns and villages in Dehgolan County
Kurdish settlements in Kurdistan Province